Aslinger Branch is a stream in Madison County, Missouri. It is a tributary of the Castor River.

Aslinger Branch has the name of the local Aslinger family.

See also
List of rivers of Missouri

References

Rivers of Madison County, Missouri
Rivers of Missouri